Adiantum peruvianum, the silver-dollar fern or Peruvian maidenhair, is a fern in the genus Adiantum. It has black stems and large flat pinnules. It is frequently grown as an ornamental greenhouse or houseplant, and is favored for its unusually large pinnules.

References

peruvianum
Flora of Peru
House plants
Plants described in 1845